Grandstand for General Staff (German: Der Feldherrnhügel) is a 1953 Austrian comedy film directed by Ernst Marischka and starring Annemarie Düringer, Adrienne Gessner and Hans Holt.

It was shot at the Sievering Studios in Vienna. The film's sets were designed by the art director Fritz Jüptner-Jonstorff.

Cast 
Annemarie Düringer as Countess Julia Kopsch-Grantignan 
Adrienne Gessner as Countess Kopsch-Grantignan, her mother 
Hans Holt as First lieutenant Geza von Hajos 
Harry Hardt as Captain von Mirkowitsch 
Susi Nicoletti as Mrs. von Mirkowitsch 
Paul Hörbiger as Colonel von Leuckfeld 
Loni Heuser as his wife
Fred Liewehr as Erzherzog Karl Viktor 
Wolfgang Lukschy as aide-de-camp von Lützelburg 
Rolf Möbius as Duke Karl Eberhard 
Alfred Neugebauer as Excellency von Hechendorf 
Svet Petrovich as Colonel Esterhazy 
Karl Schwetter as First lieutenant Riedl, Adjutant 
Franz Böheim as Ulan Nepalek 
Heinz Conrads as Ulan Lamatsch 
Ernst Waldbrunn as Ulan Kunitschek 
Richard Romanowsky as Swoboda, district governor 
Fritz Imhoff as Sergeant Koruga 
Gretl Schörg as Frau von Lamasy 
Fred Heller as regimental medic

See also 
Grandstand for General Staff (1926)
Grandstand for General Staff (1932)

References

External links

Austrian historical comedy films
Films directed by Ernst Marischka
Austrian films based on plays
Films set in the 1900s
Military humor in film
Remakes of Austrian films
Remakes of German films
Austrian black-and-white films
1950s historical comedy films
Films set in the Austrian Empire
Films shot at Sievering Studios
1950s German-language films